Ivo Krbek (23 August 1890 – 17 January 1966) was a Croatian politician, lawyer, lecturer, and academic in the Kingdom of Yugoslavia, the Independent State of Croatia, and the Socialist Federal Republic of Yugoslavia.

Born in Zagreb on 23 August 1890, Krbek graduated from the University of Zagreb in 1912. After receiving a law degree from the university several years later, Krbek began his lengthy tenure as a Professor of Administrative Law at that institution, which lasted for more than fifty years.

His time at the University was interrupted only once, by his two-year term as the 23rd Mayor of Zagreb from 1932 to 1934.

On 17 October 1958, Krbek was honored by being inducted into the Slovenian Academy of Sciences and Arts as a full member, a very distinguished position, particularly for an ethnic Croatian.

Sources
 Krbek, Ivo at Proleksis Encyclopedia 

1890 births
1966 deaths
Mayors of Zagreb
Faculty of Law, University of Zagreb alumni
Members of the Croatian Academy of Sciences and Arts
Academic staff of the University of Zagreb
Members of the Slovenian Academy of Sciences and Arts
Croatian lawyers
Yugoslav lawyers